HD 196761 is the Henry Draper Catalogue designation for a G-type main-sequence star in the constellation Capricornus. With an apparent magnitude of 6.37 it is near the limit of what can be seen with the naked eye, but according to the Bortle Scale it may be possible to view it at night from rural skies. Based upon parallax measurements by the Hipparcos spacecraft, it is located about 47 light years from the Solar System.

It has a stellar classification of G8V with about 88% of the radius of the Sun and 81% of the Sun's mass. Compared to the Sun, this star has about half the proportion of elements other than hydrogen and helium. The projected rotational velocity of the star's equator is a relatively leisurely 3.50 km/s. This star has been examined for an infrared excess that could indicate the presence of a circumstellar disk of dust, but as of 2015 none has been detected.

The space velocity components of this star are U = −59, V = 20 and W = 4 km/s.

References 

Capricornus (constellation)
G-type main-sequence stars
HD, 196761
196761
7898
0796
101997
Durchmusterung objects